Peace Time is an album by Jack DeJohnette recorded in 2006 and released on the Golden Beams label in 2007.

Reception 
The Allmusic review by Michael G. Nastos states, "Jack DeJohnette's follow-up recording to Music in the Key of Om is a similarly meditative effort where he plays all the instruments, assumedly overdubbed, creating a wash of ambient ritual sound texts in a single continuous piece running over 60 minutes... This music demonstrates a fascinating aspect of DeJohnette's musical life, liberating for him for sure, and a statement that is meaningful. Be patient; breathe deeply of clean air, and drink of this truly reflective listening experience that deserves its own audience".

Awards 
The album was awarded the Grammy Award for Best New Age Album in 2008.

Track listing 
 "Peace Time" (Jack DeJohnette) - 62:07

Personnel 
 Jack DeJohnette – synthesizer, percussion

References 

Jack DeJohnette albums
2008 albums
Grammy Award for Best New Age Album
New-age albums by American artists